Narcissus elegans is a species of flowering plant in the genus Narcissus (daffodils) in the family Amaryllidaceae. This bulbous perennial is classified in Section Tazettae and is native to the western Mediterranean.

References 

elegans
Garden plants